Artur Sarnat  (born 20 September 1970 in Kraków) is a retired Polish professional footballer who played for Wisła Kraków and Polonia Warsaw in the Polish Ekstraklasa. Besides Poland, he has played in Turkey.

Club career
Sarnat spent most of his professional career with Wisła Kraków, playing in 169 league matches over ten seasons. He had a brief spell in the Turkish Super Lig with Diyarbakirspor.

References

1970 births
Living people
Polish footballers
Wawel Kraków players
Błękitni Kielce players
Wisła Kraków players
KSZO Ostrowiec Świętokrzyski players
Polonia Warsaw players
Korona Kielce players
Diyarbakırspor footballers
Polish expatriate footballers
Expatriate footballers in Turkey
Polish expatriate sportspeople in Turkey
Footballers from Kraków
Association football goalkeepers